Mindoo Phillip Park is a multipurpose stadium located in Marchand, Castries, Saint Lucia. It is a training and competition venue for cricket, football, rugby and track and field, among other sports. It was formerly a home venue for the Windward Islands cricket team.

The ground hosted two One Day Internationals, in 1978 and 1984. Both matches involved West Indies and Australia. On 12 April 1978, Australia beat West Indies by two wickets. On 19 April 1984, West Indies returned the favour, winning by seven wickets.

First-class cricket has not been played at Mindoo Phillip Park since 2001 due to the construction of Beausejour Stadium. 
The venue had previously been known as Victoria Park, but in 1979 was renamed in honour of Francis Mindoo Phillip, widely acclaimed as the island's greatest cricketer.

International Centuries
Single ODI century has been scored at the venue.

References

Buildings and structures in Castries
Cricket grounds in Saint Lucia
Football venues in Saint Lucia